Shai Pearl (or Shay Perel, ; born 1 March 1997) is an Israeli footballer who plays as a defender for Bundesliga club SC Sand and has appeared for the Israel women's national team.

Club career
In February 2022, Pearl joined German Bundesliga club SC Sand. 2.5 months later, she scored her first goal for the club in a 3–3 draw with TSG 1899 Hoffenheim.

International career
Pearl has been capped for the Israel national team, appearing for the team during the 2019 FIFA Women's World Cup qualifying cycle.

References

External links
 
 
 

1997 births
Living people
Footballers from Petah Tikva
Israeli women's footballers
Women's association football defenders
Hapoel Petah Tikva F.C. (women) players
F.C. Ramat HaSharon players
SC Sand players
Ligat Nashim players
Israel women's international footballers
Israeli expatriate women's footballers
Israeli expatriate sportspeople in Germany
Expatriate women's footballers in Germany
Jewish Israeli sportspeople
Jewish footballers
Jewish sportswomen